Yuri Olegovich Urychev (3 April 1991 – 7 September 2011) was a Russian professional ice hockey player who at the time of his death played for Lokomotiv Yaroslavl of the Kontinental Hockey League.

Death 

On 7 September 2011, Urychev was killed when a Yakovlev Yak-42 passenger aircraft, carrying nearly his entire Lokomotiv team, crashed just outside Yaroslavl, Russia. The team was traveling to Minsk to play their opening game of the season, with its coaching staff and prospects. Lokomotiv officials said "'everyone from the main roster was on the plane plus four players from the youth team."

He was injured and serving a suspension at the time and was not originally scheduled to fly to the game, but he volunteered to go to support the team even though he wouldn't be able to play.

See also 
List of ice hockey players who died during their playing career

References

External links 

1991 births
2011 deaths
Lokomotiv Yaroslavl players
Sportspeople from Yaroslavl
Russian ice hockey defencemen
Victims of the Lokomotiv Yaroslavl plane crash